Carroll H. Leavell (born October 23, 1936 in Clovis, New Mexico) is an American politician and a Republican former member of the New Mexico Senate representing District 41 from January 1997 to his retirement in December 2018.

Education
Leavell earned his BA from Eastern New Mexico University.

Elections
1996: When District 41 Republican Senator Billy McKibben left the Legislature and left the seat open, Leavell was unopposed for the June 4, 1996 Republican primary, winning with 530 votes and won the November 5 general election against Democratic nominee Pat Darcy.
2000: Leavell was unopposed for both the 2000 Republican primary, winning with 606 votes and the November 2 general election, winning with 2,749 votes.
2004: He was again unopposed for both the June 1, 2004 Republican primary, winning with 1,309 votes and the November 2 general election, winning with 9,042 votes.
2008: He was not challenged by anybody for both the June 8, 2008 Republican primary, winning with 1,619 votes and the November 4 general election, winning with 8,702 votes.
2012: Leavell faced no opposition for both the June 5, 2012 Republican primary, winning with 1,303 votes and the November 6 general election, winning with 8,413 votes.
2016: He again faced no challengers for both the June 7, 2016 Republican primary, garnering 1,741 votes and the November 8 general election, where he won with 9,006 votes. These were his last contests.

References

External links

Carroll Leavell at Ballotpedia
Carroll Leavell at the National Institute on Money in State Politics

1936 births
Living people
Eastern New Mexico University alumni
Republican Party New Mexico state senators
People from Clovis, New Mexico
People from Lea County, New Mexico
21st-century American politicians